Chryseobacterium taichungense  is a Gram-negative, rod-shaped and non-spore-forming bacteria from the genus of Chryseobacterium which has been isolated from soil which was contaminated with tar in Taichung in Taiwan.

References

Further reading

External links
Type strain of Chryseobacterium taichungense at BacDive -  the Bacterial Diversity Metadatabase

taichungense
Bacteria described in 2005